Argyrotaenia is a genus of moths in the tribe Archipini within the family Tortricidae.

Species

Argyrotaenia albosignata Razowski & Becker, 2000
Argyrotaenia alisellana (Robinson, 1869)
Argyrotaenia altera Razowski & Wojtusiak, 2008
Argyrotaenia amatana (Dyar, 1901)
Argyrotaenia artocopa (Meyrick, 1932)
Argyrotaenia atima (Walsingham, 1914)
Argyrotaenia atrata Razowski & Wojtusiak, 2009
Argyrotaenia bialbistriata Brown & Cramer, 2000
Argyrotaenia bisignata Razowski, 1999
Argyrotaenia brimuncus Razowski & Becker, 2000
Argyrotaenia burnsorum Powell, 1960
Argyrotaenia burroughsi Obraztsov, 1961
Argyrotaenia cacaoticaria (Razowski & Wojtusiak, 2006)
Argyrotaenia ceramica Razowski, 1999
Argyrotaenia chiapasi Razowski & Becker, 2010
Argyrotaenia chillana Razowski, 1999
Argyrotaenia chroeca Razowski & Becker, 2000
Argyrotaenia cibdela Razowski, 1988
Argyrotaenia citharexylana (Zeller, 1866)
Argyrotaenia coconinana Brown & Cramer, 2000
Argyrotaenia coloradanus (Fernald, 1882)
Argyrotaenia confinis Razowski & Becker, 2000
Argyrotaenia cordillerae Razowski & Wojtusiak, 2006
Argyrotaenia cubae Razowski & Becker, 2010
Argyrotaenia cupreographa Razowski & Becker, 2000
Argyrotaenia cupressae Powell, 1960
Argyrotaenia dearmata Razowski & Becker, 2000
Argyrotaenia dichotoma (Walsingham, 1914)
Argyrotaenia dichroaca (Walsingham, 1914)
Argyrotaenia dispositana (Zeller, 1877)
Argyrotaenia dorsalana (Dyar, 1903)
Argyrotaenia felisana Razowski, 1999
Argyrotaenia ferruginea Razowski & Wojtusiak, 2006
Argyrotaenia flavoreticulana Austin & Dombroskie, 2019
Argyrotaenia floridana Obraztsov, 1961
Argyrotaenia fortis Razowski & Becker, 2000
Argyrotaenia fragosa Razowski & Becker, 2000
Argyrotaenia franciscana (Walsingham, 1879)
Argyrotaenia glabra Razowski & Becker, 2000
Argyrotaenia gogana (Kearfott, 1907)
Argyrotaenia graceana Powell, 1960
Argyrotaenia granpiedrae Razowski & Becker, 2010
Argyrotaenia graviduncus Razowski & Wojtusiak, 2010
Argyrotaenia griseina Razowski & Wojtusiak, 2010
Argyrotaenia guatemalica (Walsingham, 1914)
Argyrotaenia haemothicta (Meyrick, 1926)
Argyrotaenia hemixia Razowski, 1991
Argyrotaenia heureta (Walsingham, 1914)
Argyrotaenia hodgesi Heppner, 1989
Argyrotaenia interfasciae Razowski & Wojtusiak, 2010
Argyrotaenia iopsamma (Meyrick, 1931)
Argyrotaenia isolatissima Powell, 1964
Argyrotaenia ivana (Fernald, 1901)
Argyrotaenia jamaicana Razowski & Becker, 2000
Argyrotaenia juglandana (Fernald, 1879)
Argyrotaenia kimballi Obraztsov, 1961
Argyrotaenia klotsi Obraztsov, 1961
Argyrotaenia lautana Powell, 1960
Argyrotaenia levidensa Razowski, 1991
Argyrotaenia lignea (Meyrick, 1917)
Argyrotaenia lignitaenia Powell, 1965
Argyrotaenia ljungiana (Thunberg, 1797)
Argyrotaenia lobata Razowski, 1988
Argyrotaenia lojalojae Razowski & Becker, 2010
Argyrotaenia loxonephes (Meyrick, 1937)
Argyrotaenia magnuncus Razowski & Wojtusiak, 2008
Argyrotaenia mariana (Fernald, 1882)
Argyrotaenia martini Powell, 1960
Argyrotaenia mesosignaria Razowski, 1999
Argyrotaenia minisignaria Razowski, 1999
Argyrotaenia montezumae (Walsingham, 1914)
Argyrotaenia neibana Razowski, 1999
Argyrotaenia nigrorbis Razowski & Wojtusiak, 2010
Argyrotaenia niscana (Kearfott, 1907)
Argyrotaenia nuezana Razowski, 1999
Argyrotaenia obvoluta Razowski & Becker, 2000
Argyrotaenia occultana Freeman, 1942
Argyrotaenia ochrochroa Razowski, 1999
Argyrotaenia octavana Brown & Cramer, 2000
Argyrotaenia oligachthes (Meyrick, 1932)
Argyrotaenia onorei Razowski & Pelz, 2004
Argyrotaenia oriphanes (Meyrick, 1930)
Argyrotaenia paiuteana Powell, 1960
Argyrotaenia parturita Razowski & Becker, 2000
Argyrotaenia pilalona Razowski & Wojtusiak, 2008
Argyrotaenia pinatubana (Kearfott, 1905)
Argyrotaenia polvosana Obraztsov, 1961
Argyrotaenia pomililiana Trematerra & Brown, 2004
Argyrotaenia ponera (Walsingham, 1914)
Argyrotaenia posticicnephaea Razowski & Wojtusiak, 2009
Argyrotaenia posticirosea Razowski & Wojtusiak, 2010
Argyrotaenia potosiana Razowski & Becker, 2010
Argyrotaenia provana (Kearfott, 1907)
Argyrotaenia purata (Meyrick, 1932)
Argyrotaenia quadrifasciana (Fernald, 1882)
Argyrotaenia quercifoliana Fitch, 1858
Argyrotaenia repertana Freeman, 1944
Argyrotaenia rufina Razowski & Wojtusiak, 2010
Argyrotaenia rufescens Razowski & Wojtusiak, 2009
Argyrotaenia sagata Razowski & Becker, 2000
Argyrotaenia santacatarinae Razowski & Becker, 2010
Argyrotaenia scotina Razowski & Pelz, 2004
Argyrotaenia spaldingiana Obraztsov, 1961
Argyrotaenia sphaleropa (Meyrick, 1909)
Argyrotaenia spinacallis Brown & Cramer, 2000
Argyrotaenia subcordillerae Razowski & Wojtusiak, 2008
Argyrotaenia tabulana Freeman, 1944
Argyrotaenia telemacana Razowski & Becker, 2010
Argyrotaenia tenuis Razowski & Wojtusiak, 2008
Argyrotaenia thamaluncus Razowski, 1999
Argyrotaenia tristriata (Meyrick, 1931)
Argyrotaenia tucumana Trematerra & Brown, 2004
Argyrotaenia unda Brown & Cramer, 2000
Argyrotaenia urbana (Busck, 1912)
Argyrotaenia velutinana (Walker, 1863)
Argyrotaenia venezuelana (Walker, 1863)
Argyrotaenia vinalesiae Razowski & Becker, 2010

See also
List of Tortricidae genera

References

 , 2005: World Catalogue of Insects volume 5 Tortricidae.
 , 1989 (1990): A new species of Argyrotaenia from Arizona (Lepidoptera: Tortricidae). Journal of Research on the Lepidoptera 28 (1-2): 97–99.
 , 1961: Descriptions of and Notes on North and Central American Species of Argyrotaenia, with the description of a new Genus (Lepidoptera: Tortricidae). American Museum Novitates 2048: 1-42. Full article: .
 , 2000: Description of nine Neotropical genera of Archipini (Lepidoptera, Tortricidae) and their species. Acta Zoologica Cracoviensia 43 (3-4): 199–216.
 , 2000: Revision of the Neotropical Argyrotaenia Stephens, with notes on Diedra Rubinoff & Powell (Lepidoptera: Tortricidae). Acta Zoologica Cracoviensia 43 (3-4): 307–332.
 , 2010: Systematic and distributional data on Neotropical Archipini (Lepidoptera: Tortricidae). Acta Zoologica Cracoviensia 53B (1-2): 9-38. DOI: 10.3409/azc.53b_1-2.09-38. Full article: .
 , 2006: Tortricidae from Venezuela (Lepidoptera: Tortricidae). Shilap Revista de Lepidopterologia 34 133): 35-79 
 , 2009: Tortricidae (Lepidoptera) from the mountains of Ecuador and remarks on their geographical distribution. Part IV. Eastern Cordillera. Acta Zoologica Cracoviensia 51B (1-2): 119–187. doi:10.3409/azc.52b_1-2.119-187. Full article: .
 , 1852, Specimens Br. Anim. Colln. Br. Mus. 10: 67.
 , 2010: Tortricidae (Lepidoptera) from Peru. Acta Zoologica Cracoviensia 53B (1-2): 73-159. . Full article: .

External links
tortricidae.com

Archipini
 
Tortricidae genera
Taxa named by James Francis Stephens